Seoul Theological University is an evangelical bible college founded in 1911 to cultivate Christian workers and leaders on the basis of the traditions and precepts of the Korea Evangelical Holiness Church.

The university was established to uphold a higher scholastic standard in conformity with the Wesleyan model of spiritual life so as to apply it to the students in order to cultivate dedicated missionaries who are well balanced with theological knowledge, faith and life experiences.

References

External links 

Universities and colleges in Gyeonggi Province
Evangelical seminaries and theological colleges
Evangelicalism in South Korea
Educational institutions established in 1911
Bucheon
1911 establishments in Korea